LifeArc is a British life science medical research charity. It was established in 2000 as MRC Technology to translate the work of UK Medical Research Council (MRC) research scientists.

Today, LifeArc provides intellectual property identification, protection and commercialisation, technology development, diagnostic development, early stage drug discovery and antibody humanization services for the MRC, academia, biotechnology and pharmaceutical organisations and charities, aiming to move promising medical research forward into viable and accessible patient treatments. Profits from LifeArc's activities are reinvested into further research.

LifeArc uses funds from royalty payments to provide grants into rare disease research and allocates seed funding to UK companies.

History 

LifeArc started as the Medical Research Council Liaison Office in 1984, and in 1986 the MRC Collaborative Centre, a laboratory-based technology transfer function, was founded. In 1993, the Liaison Office became MRC's Technology Transfer Group, responsible for office based patenting and licensing.

The organisation was set up as a charity and a company limited by guarantee in 2000 to incorporate patenting, licensing and research functions.

On 15 June 2017 it  officially became LifeArc.

Activities 

LifeArc humanised a number of antibodies on behalf of other organisations. Four of these, Tysabri (Biogen Idec/Elan), Actemra (Hoffmann-La Roche/Chugai), Entyvio (Millenium Pharma/Takeda) and Keytruda (Merck/MSD), are licensed drugs.

In 2010, LifeArc signed a deal with the drug company AstraZeneca to share chemical compounds to help identify potential treatments for serious diseases.

LifeArc is a member of a Global Drug Discovery Alliance along with the Centre for Drug Research and Development, the Scripps Research Institute, Cancer Research Technology, the Lead Discovery Centre and the Centre for Drug Design and Discovery, dedicated to translating health research into new medicines and working together to improve the conversion of global early-stage research into much-needed new therapies. Through its earnings from licensing agreements, LifeArc provides funding for academic research and early-stage medical research.

Dementia Consortium was launched in December 2013 - a unique £3m drug discovery collaboration between Alzheimer's Research UK, LifeArc and pharmaceutical companies Eisai and Lilly.

In March 2019, LifeArc joined with Cancer Research UK and Ono Pharma to progress new immunotherapy drug targets for cancer.

In May 2019, LifeArc announced it had sold part of its royalty rights for Keytruda to a subsidiary of Canada Pension Plan Investment Board (CPPIB) for US$1.297 billion, making it one of the biggest UK medical charities by size of investment.

In 2021, LifeArc launched a new strategy and a commitment to invest up to £1.3 billion by 2030 in life science research. At the same time, the charity announced a new approach for treating Alzheimer's disease, a result of a partnership with the Universities of Leicester and Göttingen.

Key achievements

References

External links 
 LifeArc's website

Technology transfer
Companies based in the London Borough of Camden
Medical research institutes in the United Kingdom
Charities based in London